Dracophyllum ramosum is a species of shrub or small tree in the family Ericaceae and is  endemic to New Caledonia. It was first described by Adolphe-Théodore Brongniart and Jean Antoine Arthur Gris in 1864 and gets the specific epithet ramosum for the fact that many of its branches grow from the same place. It inhabits the summits and slopes of mountains, alongside streams, and on plateaux; it reaches a height of 0.5–5 m.

References

Notes

Citations 

ramosum
Endemic flora of New Caledonia
Taxa named by Adolphe-Théodore Brongniart
Taxa named by Jean Armand Isidore Pancher
Taxa named by Jean Antoine Arthur Gris